The SteelDrivers are a bluegrass band from Nashville, Tennessee. Members include fiddler Tammy Rogers, bassist Mike Fleming, guitarist/vocalist Matt Dame, mandolinist Brent Truitt, and banjoist Richard Bailey. Past members include Kelvin Damrell, Chris Stapleton, Gary Nichols, and  Mike Henderson.  The band has recorded four albums on the Rounder Records label and one independent live album recorded at The Station Inn. The band has received several Grammy nominations and won a Grammy for the album  The Muscle Shoals Recordings.

Career

After playing at many bluegrass festivals The SteelDrivers signed to Rounder Records and released a self-titled debut in 2008, featuring new lead singer Chris Stapleton. The album peaked at No. 57 on the U.S. Billboard Top Country Albums chart. The group was nominated for a Grammy Award in 2009 for Best Country Performance by a Duo or Group with Vocals for their song "Blue Side of the Mountain." In 2010, the group received two nominations for its second album, Reckless. The album has been nominated for both Best Bluegrass Album and Best Country Performance by a Duo or Group with Vocal for the song "Where Rainbows Never Die".

Stapleton announced in April 2010, that he was leaving the band to focus on raising his family. He was replaced by former Mercury Records artist Gary Nichols on lead vocals and guitar. In December 2011, founding member Mike Henderson left the band. Henderson was replaced by Nashville musician and record producer Brent Truitt. In 2015, the new lineup received a Grammy Award for Best Bluegrass Album for its new album The Muscle Shoals Recordings.  In 2018, Kelvin Damrell became the band's new lead singer and debuted on the 2020 release Bad for You. In July 2021 Kelvin Damrell announced his departure from the band, and the band simultaneously announced the addition of Matt Dame as lead singer.

Discography

Albums

Music videos

Awards and nominations

Grammy awards

|-
|2009
|"Blue Side of the Mountain" 
|Best Country Performance by a Duo or Group with Vocal
|
|-
|rowspan="2"|2011
|Reckless 
|Best Bluegrass Album
|
|-
| "Where Rainbows Never Die" 
|Best Country Performance by a Duo or Group with Vocal
|
|-
|2015
|The Muscle Shoals Recordings
|Best Bluegrass Album
|

References

External links 

 

Musical groups from Nashville, Tennessee
American bluegrass music groups
Rounder Records artists